Dinner for Two is a Canadian animated short film, directed by Janet Perlman and released in 1996. The film centres on two chameleons who must learn to cooperate when their attempts to capture the same insect as food lead them into a life-threatening situation.

The film was a Genie Award nominee for Best Animated Short Film at the 18th Genie Awards in 1997.

Perlman also later published the story as an illustrated children's book, under the title The Delicious Bug.

References

External links
 

1996 short films
1996 films
1996 animated films
Canadian animated short films
National Film Board of Canada animated short films
Animated films about lizards
Animated films without speech
Films directed by Janet Perlman
1990s Canadian films